Shavonte Zellous (born August 28, 1986) is an American-Croatian professional basketball player who is currently a free agent. She was a standout basketball player at the University of Pittsburgh. Zellous was drafted 11th in the first round of the 2009 WNBA Draft by the Shock.

Professional career

As a rookie in 2009, Zellous ranked second among rookies in points (11.9), was second overall in the league in free throws made (155) and averaged 1.8 assists per game. Zellous scored in double digits in 21 of the 34 games played during her first season and earned honors by making the WNBA All-Rookie Team, the lowest draft selection to ever make the All-Rookie team up until that point. Zellous was a member of the Indiana Fever team that won the WNBA championship in 2012 and was named a WNBA All-Star in 2013.

In 2013, Zellous almost doubled her scoring average, from 7.5 ppg in 2012 to 14.7 ppg in 2013. This improvement, coupled with increases in rebounding  and shooting percentage helped her to win the WNBA Most-Improved player award in 2013.

On February 1, 2016, Zellous signed with the New York Liberty. Her WNBA averages include 39.5% in Field Goals, 80.3% in free throws, and 9.2 PPG.

On April 11, 2019, Zellous signed with the Seattle Storm.

On March 31, 2021, Zellous signed with the Washington Mystics, appearing in 28 games during the season.

College career
While in college, Zellous was a standout guard for the University of Pittsburgh women's basketball team from 2005 to 2009.  While there, she helped lead her team to a WNIT "Final Four" in 2006 and three straight NCAA tournament appearances from 2007 to 2009, during which her team advanced to the "Sweet Sixteen" in 2008 and 2009. While at Pitt, she earned Third Team AP All-American honors in 2009 and was the Big East Conference Most Improved Player in 2007.  Zellous finished her career at Pitt ranked third on the university's all-time scoring list with 2,253 points.  Zellous also became the first player in Pitt history (men's or women's) and the ninth in Big East history (men's or women's) to score 600 points in three separate seasons.

College statistics
Source

References

1986 births
Living people
All-American college women's basketball players
American emigrants to Croatia
American expatriate basketball people in Turkey
American women's basketball players
Croatian expatriate basketball people in Turkey
Croatian people of African-American descent
Croatian women's basketball players
Detroit Shock players
Fenerbahçe women's basketball players
Indiana Fever players
Jones High School (Orlando, Florida) alumni
LGBT basketball players
LGBT people from Florida
Lesbian sportswomen
Naturalized citizens of Croatia
New York Liberty players
Pittsburgh Panthers women's basketball players
Seattle Storm players
Shooting guards
Basketball players from Orlando, Florida
Tulsa Shock players
Washington Mystics players
Women's National Basketball Association All-Stars
Women's National Basketball Association players from Croatia